Abhimaan is a 1973 Indian Hindi musical drama film directed by Hrishikesh Mukherjee, starring Amitabh Bachchan, Jaya Bachchan, Asrani, Bindu and David.

According to Aalif Surti, the film is based on the troublesome marriage between two Hindustani classical music maestros, the sitarist Ravi Sankar and the surbahar player Annapurna Devi, though author Raju Bharatan states that Hrishikesh Mukherjee based the film's story on the life of singer Kishore Kumar and his first wife, Ruma Ghosh. The 1954 film A Star Is Born has also been cited as a vague influence.

The film is perhaps best remembered for its songs, composed and arranged by S. D. Burman, written by Majrooh Sultanpuri, and sung by playback singers Kishore Kumar, Mohammed Rafi, and Lata Mangeshkar. The film was a major hit at the box office and is amongst the earliest hits of Bachchan's career. Jaya Bachchan won the Filmfare Best Actress Award for Abhimaan.

Synopsis
Subir is a professional singer with a soaring career. He does not plan to marry—until he meets Uma, a sweet village girl who is musically gifted. Subir falls in love with Uma and marries her. He returns to Mumbai with his new bride. Subir continues as a singer and also fosters Uma's singing career. His career falters, however, just as Uma's singing career begins to thrive. Eventually, she becomes more successful than her husband, sparking jealousy from Subir. His pride and jealousy tear the marriage apart. The question becomes whether Subir can overcome his jealousy. The movie reaches a very sensitive situation when the couple separates and Uma has a miscarriage. After heavy criticism from his aunt, they comes together again in an emotional reunion and they sing together.

Cast 
 Amitabh Bachchan as Subir Kumar
 Jaya Bachchan as Uma Kumar
 Asrani as Chander Kripalani
 David as Brajeshwarlal
 Bindu as Chitra
 Durga Khote as Durga Mausi
 A. K. Hangal as Sadanand
 Lalita Kumari as Radha
 Master Raju

Crew
 Director : Hrishikesh Mukherjee
 Story : Hrishikesh Mukherjee
 Screenplay : Nabendu Ghosh, Biresh Chatterjee, Mohini N. Sippy
 Dialogue : Rajinder Singh Bedi
 Producer : Susheela Kamat, Pawan Kumar Jain
 Editor : Das Dhaimade
 Cinematographer : Jaywant Pathare
 Art Director : Ajit Banerjee
 Costume and Wardrobe : Shalini Shah, Ramlal Maheswari
 Production Manager : J.S. Tripathy, Prakash Walawalkar, Uday Walawalkar
 Assistant Director : Shakeel Chandra, Susheela Kamat, Nitin Mukesh
 Assistant Editor : Hari Bhoir, Shridhar Mishra, Shankar Pradhan
 Assistant Art Director : Mahendra Balasinorwala, Shanker Kurade 
 Music Director : Sachin Dev Burman
 Music Assistant : Meera Dev Burman, Anil Mohile, Arun Paudwal, Maruti Rao
 Playback Singers : Kishore Kumar, Lata Mangeshkar, Mohammad Rafi, Manhar Udhas

Production
The movie was made under the production AmiYa (Amitabh + Jaya), although the copyrights are owned by their secretaries.

Lata Mangeshkar was the sole voice of Jaya Bachchan in the movie, whereas Amitabh Bachchan was voiced by three singers.

Manhar Udhas recorded the demo for "Loote Koi Man Ka Nagar" and it was supposed to be sung by Mukesh; however Mukesh refused because he thought the demo sounded good and Udhas ought to be given a chance.

Release

The film was screened as inaugural film at 28th Kolkata International Film Festival on 15 December 2022, almost 50 years after its first screening.

Soundtrack
All of the music of the movie was composed by S. D. Burman, winning him the Filmfare Award for Best Music Director. The lyrics were penned by Majrooh Sultanpuri.

The songs "Tere Mere Milan Ki Yeh Raina" and "Meet Na Mila Re Man Ka" were listed at the 16th and 23rd spots, respectively, on Binaca Geetmala's Annual List for 1973.

Awards and nominations

Influence

The film was also a turning point for Bindu, who, for the first time, played a sympathetic character. Previously, she was known for playing vamps/cabaret dancers, such as in Amitabh's star-making hit Zanjeer (1973). This film was very popular in Sri Lanka more than in India and was screened continuously for 590 days in the same cinema, Empire, Colombo.

References

External links
 
 The Haunting Notes of Abhimaan

1970s Hindi-language films
1973 films
Films scored by S. D. Burman
Films directed by Hrishikesh Mukherjee
Films about singers